The First Battle of Çatalca was one of the heaviest battles of the First Balkan War fought between . It was initiated as an attempt of the combined Bulgarian First and Third armies, under the overall command of lieutenant general Radko Dimitriev, to defeat the Ottoman Çatalca Army and break through the last defensive line before the capital Constantinople. The high casualties however forced the Bulgarians to call off the attack.

References

Sources

External links
 Photographs from Çatalca
 The Battle of Çatalca

Catalca
Conflicts in 1912
1912 in the Ottoman Empire
Battles involving the Ottoman Empire
Catalca 1
History of Istanbul Province
November 1912 events
Çatalca